Onyango is a surname used by Luo people in Kenya, South Sudan and Uganda meaning "Born in the Early Morning":

Adelle Onyango (born 1989), Kenyan radio presenter, social activist and media personality
Brian Onyango (born 1994), Kenyan footballer player
Charles Onyango-Obbo (born 1958), Ugandan author, journalist, editor of The Monitor
Denis Onyango (born 1985), Ugandan football player
Joash Onyango (born 1993), Kenyan football player
Joe Oloka-Onyango (born 1960), Ugandan lawyer and academic
Lameck Onyango (born 1973), Kenyan cricketer
Lucas Onyango (born 1981), Kenyan rugby player
Zeituni Onyango (1952–2014), public health and half-aunt of Barack Obama

Fictional
Tobias Onyango Fünke, a fictional character on the television show Arrested Development

Kenyan names